Krathum Baen is a town (Thesaban Mueang) in the Krathum Baen District (Amphoe) of Samut Sakhon Province in the Bangkok Metropolitan Region of Central Thailand. In 2014, it had a total population of 21,904 people.

References

Populated places in Samut Sakhon province